In organic chemistry, nitration is a general class of chemical processes for the introduction of a nitro group into an organic compound. The term also is applied incorrectly to the different process of forming nitrate esters between alcohols and nitric acid (as occurs in the synthesis of nitroglycerin). The difference between the resulting molecular structures of nitro compounds and nitrates is that the nitrogen atom in nitro compounds is directly bonded to a non-oxygen atom (typically carbon or another nitrogen atom), whereas in nitrate esters (also called organic nitrates), the nitrogen is bonded to an oxygen atom that in turn usually is bonded to a carbon atom (nitrito group).

There are many major industrial applications of nitration in the strict sense; the most important by volume are for the production of nitroaromatic compounds such as nitrobenzene. Nitration reactions are notably used for the production of explosives, for example the conversion of guanidine to nitroguanidine and the conversion of toluene to trinitrotoluene (TNT). However, they are of wide importance as chemical intermediates and precursors. Millions of tons of nitroaromatics are produced annually.

Aromatic nitration
Typical nitration syntheses apply so-called "mixed acid", a mixture of concentrated nitric acid and sulfuric acids. This mixture produces the nitronium ion (NO2+), which is the active species in aromatic nitration. This active ingredient, which can be isolated in the case of nitronium tetrafluoroborate, also effects nitration without the need for the mixed acid. In mixed-acid syntheses sulfuric acid is not consumed and hence acts as a catalyst as well as an absorbent for water.  In the case of nitration of benzene, the reaction is conducted at a warm temperature, not exceeding 50 °C.  The process is one example of electrophilic aromatic substitution, which involves the attack by the electron-rich benzene ring:

Alternative mechanisms have also been proposed, including one involving single electron transfer (SET).
Acetyl nitrate had also been used as a nitration agent.

Scope
Selectivity can be a challenge in nitrations because as a rule more than one compound may result but only one is desired, so alternative products act as contaminants or are simply wasted. Accordingly, it is desirable to design syntheses with suitable selectivity; for example, by controlling the reaction conditions, fluorenone can be selectively trinitrated or tetranitrated.

The substituents on aromatic rings affect the rate of this electrophilic aromatic substitution. Deactivating groups such as other nitro groups have an electron-withdrawing effect. Such groups deactivate (slow) the reaction and directs the electrophilic nitronium ion to attack the aromatic meta position. Deactivating meta-directing substituents include sulfonyl, cyano groups, keto, esters, and carboxylates. Nitration can be accelerated by activating groups such as amino, hydroxy and methyl groups also amides and ethers resulting in para and ortho isomers.

The direct nitration of aniline with nitric acid and sulfuric acid, according to one source, results in a 50/50 mixture of para- and meta-nitroaniline isomers. In this reaction the fast-reacting and activating aniline (ArNH2) exists in equilibrium with the more abundant but less reactive (deactivated) anilinium ion (ArNH3+), which may explain this reaction product distribution. According to another source, a more controlled nitration of aniline starts with the formation of acetanilide by reaction with acetic anhydride followed by the actual nitration. Because the amide is a regular activating group the products formed are the para and ortho isomers. Heating the reaction mixture is sufficient to hydrolyze the amide back to the nitrated aniline.

In the Wolffenstein–Böters reaction, benzene reacts with nitric acid and mercury(II) nitrate to give picric acid.

Ipso nitration
With aryl chlorides, triflates and nonaflates, ipso nitration may also take place. The phrase ipso nitration was first used by Perrin and Skinner in 1971, in an investigation into chloroanisole nitration. In one protocol, 4-chloro-n-butylbenzene is reacted with sodium nitrite in t-butanol in the presence of  0.5 mol% Pd2(dba)3, a biarylphosphine ligand and a phase-transfer catalyst to provide 4-nitro-n-butylbenzene.

See also 
 Menke nitration
 Zincke nitration
 Reactive nitrogen species

References 

Nitration reactions
Substitution reactions